Xinyuan County as the official romanized name, also transliterated from Uyghur as Künas County, is a county in the Xinjiang Uyghur Autonomous Region and is under the administration of the Ili Kazakh Autonomous Prefecture. It contains an area of 7,581 km2. According to the 2002 census, it has a population of 290,000. The county is served by Xinyuan Nalati Airport.

Name
The county's original name Künes was changed into Xinyuan in 1946 after the county established its seat on the Künes River upstream. "Xinyuan" means "New Headstream" in Chinese.

Administrative divisions
There are 9 towns in Xinyuan (Kunas) County, which are as follows:

Note:
1. On October 21, 2014, with the approval of the Xinjiang Uygur Autonomous Region People's Government, it was renamed the original Almali Township to Almali Town. 
2. On July 13, 2016, with the approval of the Xinjiang Uygur Autonomous Region People's Government, it was renamed the original Kansu Township to Kansu Town. 
3. On March 30, 2012, with the approval of the People's Government of the Xinjiang Uygur Autonomous Region, the original  Karabora Township was renamed Karabora Town.

There are 2 townships in Kunas County, which are as follows:

Climate

References

County-level divisions of Xinjiang
Ili Kazakh Autonomous Prefecture